is a former Japanese football player. He played for Japan national team.

Club career
Moriyama was born in Gifu on May 1, 1969. After graduating from Juntendo University, he joined Nagoya Grampus Eight in 1992. The club won the champions at 1995 Emperor's Cup. In Asia, the club won the 2nd place at 1996–97 Asian Cup Winners' Cup. From the late 1990s, he moved to many clubs Bellmare Hiratsuka (1998), HIT Gorica (1998-99), Sanfrecce Hiroshima (1999), Kawasaki Frontale (2000) and Consadole Sapporo (2002-03). 

In July 2004, he announced his retirement at Nagoya Grampus Eight. In 2005, he came back as player at his local club FC Gifu played in Regional Leagues. The club was promoted to Japan Football League in 2007 and J2 League in 2008. He retired end of 2008 season.

In February 2019, he took the job of player-team director at Japan Football League club FC Maruyasu Okazaki. Although he was registered as a player for two seasons until 2020, he did not play in the match.

National team career
On June 15, 1997, Moriyama debuted for Japan national team against Turkey.

Club statistics

National team statistics

Honours
 Slovenian PrvaLiga Runner-up: 1998-99

References

External links
 
Japan National Football Team Database

1969 births
Living people
Juntendo University alumni
Association football people from Gifu Prefecture
Japanese footballers
Japan international footballers
J1 League players
J2 League players
Japan Football League players
Nagoya Grampus players
Shonan Bellmare players
ND Gorica players
Sanfrecce Hiroshima players
Kawasaki Frontale players
Hokkaido Consadole Sapporo players
FC Gifu players
FC Maruyasu Okazaki players
Japanese expatriate footballers
Expatriate footballers in Slovenia
Association football forwards